Leucanthemella serotina, called the autumn ox-eye, is a species of flowering plant in the genus Leucanthemella, native to Poland, Czechia, Slovakia, Hungary, Serbia, Croatia, Slovenia, Montenegro, Bosnia and Herzegovina, Macedonia, Romania, Bulgaria, and Ukraine, and introduced to Connecticut, Massachusetts, Michigan, Minnesota and New York in the United States, Ontario and Québec in Canada, and France, Germany, Great Britain, and Switzerland. It has gained the Royal Horticultural Society's Award of Garden Merit, and is also considered by them to be a good plant to attract pollinators.

References

Anthemideae
Flora of Central Europe
Flora of Southeastern Europe
Flora of Ukraine
Plants described in 1961